The sixth season of Canadian sketch comedy series The Kids in the Hall aired in 2022; it was a revival, after 27 years, of the original series, which aired for five seasons from 1988 to 1995. Unlike the first five seasons, which aired on CBC in Canada and HBO, then CBS, in the United States, the sixth season aired on the Amazon Prime Video streaming service. It was greenlit and produced by Amazon Prime Video Canada, and was that subsidiary's first original series. The revival was announced in early 2020, but due to the COVID-19 pandemic, filming did not commence until mid-2021.

Unlike the previous seasons, season six was not filmed in front of a live audience, nor is it presented with a laugh track. Characters from previous seasons appear in the sixth season, along with a host of new ones. The new season also features a variety of guest stars, the majority of which take part in a recurring segment called "Friends of Kids of the Hall". The season is again executive produced by Lorne Michaels. The Canadian band Shadowy Men on a Shadowy Planet took part in the filming of the new season's opening to play the show's theme song, an instrumental version of "Having an Average Weekend" though the original recording was used instead. Bassist Dallas Good died months before the revival premiered.

Cast and characters

Main
 Dave Foley as various
 Bruce McCulloch as various
 Kevin McDonald as various
 Mark McKinney as various 
 Scott Thompson as various

Guest
 Pete Davidson as Donavan 
 Catherine O'Hara as Charlene  
 Kenan Thompson as Ron 
 Will Forte as Aaron 
 Samantha Bee as Jillian 
 Fred Armisen as Michael 
 Tracee Ellis Ross as Lainie 
 Eddie Izzard as Repairman 
 Mark Hamill as Sasha 
 Paul Bellini as himself and Voice of the Glory Hole
 Paul Sun-Hyung Lee as Mr. Lewis 
 Jay Baruchel as Smoker 
 Catherine Reitman as Diane 
 Brandon Ash-Mohammed as Security Guard 
 Colin Mochrie as Police Detective 
 Kenneth Welsh as Martin

Episodes

Production

Development
Following five seasons of The Kids in the Hall and the 1996 follow-up film, The Kids in the Hall: Brain Candy, the comedy troupe would reunite for a series of live shows. In 2010, they created the dark comedy mini-series The Kids in the Hall: Death Comes to Town. Instead of comedy sketches, Death Comes to Town centers around one continuous storyline with the troupe performing an array of original characters. Several of The Kids in the Hall characters appear in cameo roles: Chicken Lady, Paul Bellini (in his signature towel) and tweaked versions of Bruce McCulloch and Mark McKinney's police officers characters. Talks of a Kids in the Hall reboot followed. In 2018, Dave Foley reached out and had lunch with Britta von Schoeler at Broadway Video. Foley mentioned that 2018 marked the 30th anniversary of the original series. This led to discussions about having the show return. In March 2020, Amazon Prime Video Canada announced that it had ordered a new season of the original Kids in the Hall sketch show.

Filming
Production on the new season was halted due to the COVID-19 pandemic. Filming commenced in late May 2021 in Toronto, Canada under the code name "Sweater Vest".

Reception
The review aggregator website Rotten Tomatoes reported a 100% approval rating for the sixth season, based on 23 reviews, with an average rating of 8.30/10. The website’s critical consensus reads, "The Kids in the Hall have become seasoned comedy veterans without missing a beat, delivering a fresh set of sketches that will delight longtime fans." Metacritic, which uses a weighted average, assigned a score of 83 out of 100 based on 6 critics, indicating "generally favorable reviews". Total Film praised the new season, writing that "skeptic fans of the flagship show will be delighted to see that not only have the Kids maintained their strange sense of humor, but have become absolute masters of their craft – reminding everyone who the true kings of comedy really are."

References

External links
 
 

6
2022 Canadian television seasons